DMAC, D-MAC, or D-Mac may refer to:

People
 Donovan McNabb (born 1976), a quarterback for the Washington Redskins, formerly of the Philadelphia Eagles
 Darren McFadden (born 1987), a running back formerly of the University of Arkansas Razorbacks and currently with the Oakland Raiders
 Darryl McDonald (born 1964), a retired American-Australian professional basketball player
 Devin McCourty (born 1987), an American football safety for the New England Patriots

Science and medicine
 Dimethylacetamide (DMAc), a widely used chemical solvent
 Disseminated Mycobacterium avium-intracellulare complex, the systemic type of Mycobacterium avium-intracellulare infection
 Dubai Medium Aperture Camera, the primary payload of the observation satellite DubaiSat-1

Other uses
 Digital Media Arts College, a private college in Boca Raton, Florida, USA
 D-MAC, a variant of the MAC (Multiplexed Analogue Components) systems for television broadcasting
 Diving Medical Advisory Council, an independent organisation of diving medical specialists
 An abbreviation of 'Direct Memory Access Controller', a device used to perform Direct Memory Access
A version of the Wu-tang dance

See also
 DMA (disambiguation)
 p-dimethylaminocinnamaldehyde (DMACA), a chemical and a method to evaluate the polyphenolic content of a sample